The Western Australian Planning Commission (WAPC) is an independent statutory authority of the Government of Western Australia that exists to coordinate strategic and statutory planning for future urban, rural, and regional land use. The authority is responsible for expenditure arising from the Metropolitan Region Improvement Tax.

The role of the commission is to advise the Minister for Planning, make statutory decisions on a range of planning application types, approve subdivision applications, implement the state planning framework, and prepare and review region schemes to cater for anticipated growth. All staffing is provided by the Department of Planning, Lands and Heritage to which it also delegates many statutory powers.

History
The Planning and Development Act of 1928 established a Town Planning Board as the central authority responsible for approving subdivision and town planning schemes prepared by local government. The state’s Town Planning Commissioner David Davidson sought to expand the board responsibilities into planning for the metropolitan region as a whole—however in 1927 a separate Metropolitan Town Planning Commission was established to prepare a report on the matter of metropolitan planning, after which it was disbanded.

In 1952, a second commission recommended the metropolitan planning of Perth and Fremantle leading to the appointment of Gordon Stephenson to prepare the 1955 Plan for Perth and Fremantle. This report recommended the creation of an independent authority for the implementation of a metropolitan town planning scheme. In 1959, this authority was created as the Metropolitan Regional Planning Authority (MRPA) with David Carr as the chief planner. In 1963 the Metropolitan Region Scheme was adopted by the Parliament of Western Australia.

The MRPA was funded by a hypothecated property tax under the MRS which gave it an independent source of revenue that allowed it to disregard Government direction. This led to its abolition in December 1985, with bi-partisan support, when the Metropolitan Regional Planning Authority became the Metropolitan Planning Council under a State Planning Commission which also absorbed the functions of the Town Planning Board.

In September 1989 the State Planning Commission became an advisory and decision-making body with all staff transferred to the Department of Planning and Urban Development. It was subsequently renamed the Western Australian Planning Commission in 1995.

References

Statutory agencies of Western Australia
Urban planning in Australia
Urban planning organizations